i-Witness, formerly i-Witness: The GMA Documentaries is a Philippine television documentary show broadcast by GMA Network and GMA News TV. Originally hosted by Vicky Morales, Luchi Cruz-Valdes, Mike Enriquez, Cheche Lazaro and Jessica Soho, it premiered on January 18, 1999. It is the longest-running documentary program in Philippine television. The show concluded on GMA Network on April 29, 2020. The show moved to GMA News TV on August 14, 2020 on the network's Power Block line up. The show returned to GMA Network on January 16, 2021 on the network's Sabado Star Power sa Gabi line up. Kara David, Howie Severino, Sandra Aguinaldo, Atom Araullo, Mav Gonzales and John Consulta currently serve as the hosts.

The series is streaming online on YouTube.

Hosts

 Kara David 
 Howie Severino 
 Sandra Aguinaldo 
 Atom Araullo 
 Mav Gonzales 
 John Consulta

Former hosts 
 Vicky Morales (1999–2004)
 Luchi Cruz-Valdes (1999–2002)
 Mike Enriquez (1999–2000)
 Cheche Lazaro (1999–2004)
 Jessica Soho (1999–2004)
 Mel Tiangco (2000–2002)
 Raffy Tima (2001–2004)
 Jay Taruc (2004–2019)
 Maki Pulido (2002–2004)

Guest hosts 
 Mariz Umali
 Micaela Papa
 Joseph Morong
 Cesar Apolinario
 Emil Sumangil
 Pia Arcangel
 Ivan Mayrina
 Tina Panganiban-Perez
 Oscar Oida

Production
In March 2020, production was halted due to the enhanced community quarantine in Luzon caused by the COVID-19 pandemic. The show resumed its programming on August 14, 2020.

Accolades

References

External links
 
 

1999 Philippine television series debuts
Filipino-language television shows
GMA Network original programming
GMA Integrated News and Public Affairs shows
GMA News TV original programming
Peabody Award-winning television programs
Philippine documentary television series
Television productions suspended due to the COVID-19 pandemic